Starship Excelsior is an independently produced science fiction audio drama set in the Star Trek universe that has twice been nominated for the Parsec Awards for speculative fiction podcasting. The show was created by James Heaney in September 2007.

The series concerns the 24th century adventures of the crew of the U.S.S. Excelsior (NCC-2000-C - the "fourth starship to bear the name") in the Delta Quadrant.

The pilot episode, ...There You Are, was released on September 28, 2007, and since then 47 regular and 16 special episodes have been released, up to March 24, 2021, with the episode ...And Bear Witness. By August 2009 all episodes available at the time had been downloaded more than 20,000 times in total.

Production
Executive Producer James Heaney started the audio drama in 2007 as a means of recruiting players to a Star Trek play-by-forum role-playing game (RPG) set on the USS Excelsior-C. Heaney had joined the RPG in 2006. Characters in Starship Excelsior episodes have similarities and differences in name and background to characters in the Excelsior RPG as well as the Bravo Fleet RPG. Heaney continues as Executive Producer to the present while Mike Hennesey acts as co-producer/narrator and James Smagata leads the post-production team.

According to the show's website, "episodes are recorded in more than two dozen places on three continents", and edited on Adobe Audition and Cool Edit Pro before being released in 128k mp3 sound files. By July 2010 voice actors in the US lived in nine different states while one resided in Australia and another in New Zealand. Actors record their lines via Skype by themselves or sometimes with others. Recordings are uploaded to a server for post-production, using a custom-built browser-based production management program that Heaney developed with others.

After the actors' lines are conjoined in Adobe Audition, sound effects and music are added. Original theme music was composed by Sam Gillis and introduced in Episode #103. The resulting audio mix is peer reviewed and adjusted where necessary, before final episodes are released. Like the actors, the post-production team also collaborates online without physically meeting each other. As a result of these challenging logistics, added to the length of its story, the third season took three years to produce.

Starship Excelsior was a Parsec Award nominee in 2010 and a finalist in 2011 for Best Speculative Fiction Audio Drama (Long Form).

Summary
While the audio drama is divided into seasons, each with its own story and tied off plot-threads, every season also contains plot points that drive forward the narrative of the next one. The producers intend the show to present stories that "are long, arc-based, character-driven, and very involved".

Season One: The Excelsior Returns (2007-08) 
The pilot episode (#100) opens on Stardate 59932.1 (2382) with the USS Excelsior docked at Starbase 911. The starbase is in orbit around Union III, a Class M planet located near a wormhole "constructed in ancient times by the extinct Iconians" as a route between the Alpha and Delta Quadrants. As the task force's standard-bearer, the Excelsior 's mission is ostensibly to explore the Delta Quadrant. The ship's crew arrives to assume their duties as part of Task Force 38, assigned by Starfleet Command to the Delta Quadrant.

The crew is sent on a third-contact diplomatic mission to a warrior-like matriarchal society on the planet Valandria. The reptilian Valandrians are embroiled in a civil war between two factions, one led by Planetary Premier Betren-Na and a rebel faction under General Sorid-Gee. The Valandrians and the Excelsior 's crew are attacked by a deadly telepathic virus known as The Wasting. Dovan and Yubari beam into catacombs where they neutralize the source of the telepathic attack with the help of Betren-Na. On Stardate 59981.43 Captain Cortez is mortally wounded during the hostilities, and Dovan assumes command of the Excelsior.

Season Two: Murder in the Blue Morgue (2008-09) 
Dovan and his crew tries to unravel a conspiracy that links the Alpha and Delta Quadrants.

Acting Captain Dovan experiences nightmares in which Cortez reproaches him for crew deaths during the battle of Valandria. Cortez meanwhile continues to be under an artificially induced coma. Admiral Parker sends the USS Sizemore (NCC-74012-A) and a hospital ship to assist the Excelsior. Dovan appoints Yubari as Chief of Security (Episode #201).

Following an explosion on the USS Sizemore (NCC-74012-A) the Excelsior returns from the Delta Quadrant via the gateway to Starbase 911 in Alpha Quadrant. Lorhrok reveals to Acting Captain Dovan that Leo Amara's death was no accident. Due to continuing difficulties arising from Lorhrok's junior grade rank, Dovan appoints him a full Lieutenant and acting First Officer (Episode #202). Yubari is kidnapped and held on the Renegade, but manages to escape, kidnapping Brahms in turn. While trying to restore a deleted isolinear chip, Rol shoots Lorhrok, apparently under the influence of an external force. As she lays dying, Cortez promotes Dovan to full commander, gives him co-ordinates to follow and mentions Dexter Remmick (Episode #203). While interrogating Brahms, Dovan reveals Cortez' heading to be 114 mark 388 mark 8 in the Delta Quadrant. Brahms' forces break him out of the Excelsior 's brig, but Rol remains behind to deliver a message to Dovan (Episode #204).

The concluding episode (#205, Golden Things) links to the third season (The Sword of Damocles).

Season Three: The Sword of Damocles (2010–13) 
The third season revolves around the Bluegills, the in-series name for the neural parasites introduced in Star Trek: The Next Generations Conspiracy episode, and relates them to the Borg.

The special episode called "Swordplay: A Recap" summarizes the overarching plot. In July 2382 General Isaac Brahms of Starfleet Intelligence, accompanied by 2nd Lts. Ryan Willis and Leo Amara, visits Captain Sharvah C Siresh on the planet Deneva to ask him to take the Excelsior from Starbase 911 to the Delta Quadrant to investigate a distress call from the SS Anbar (NAR-11007), a Class Three neutronic fuel carrier that has been missing for 60 years (see Episode #301). Apart from First Officer Rachel Cortez all Excelsior 's crew members are intelligence officers, including Ensign Philippe Ermez. In Episode #301 Crewman Adow reveals that although Ermez' official file shows he had been in Intelligence and on the USS Enterprise-E (NCC-1701-E) before joining the Excelsior, Geordi La Forge had no knowledge of Ermez.

Once on the Anbar, the crew is attacked by the Bluegills after Ensign Ermez detonates a bug bomb, releasing the Zero. First Officer Rachel Cortez kills Siresh, who had come under the control of a parasite. Ermez returns to Federation Space with the Excelsior (Episode #304). In Episode #303 (The Wreck in the Hesperus) it transpires that a mysterious event actually led to the Anbar being pulled through the passage, past the Zero, to emerge almost 19 years later.

After 2382's failed mission, Rachel Cortez is placed in command of the Excelsior and is ostensibly tasked with a diplomatic mission to the planet Valandria, but she has a covert mission. She has to take high-resolution scans of the nebula in the area where the Anbar 's calls were detected. To aid in the covert mission the Excelsior 's equipment was enhanced and Starfleet Intelligence officers Lts. Leo Amara, Alecsz Lorhrok, and Asuka Yubari were placed on board.

In 2383 Acting Captain Dovan slips the Excelsior out of Starbase 911 and heads for the Hesperus sector. General Brahms breaks out of prison and pursues Excelsior with the USS Renegade. To slow down the Excelsior, Brahms orders his pirates to destroy the colony on New Victoria (founded 2381), trusting that Dovan would aid the colonists (Episode #302).

Near the Anbar the Excelsior is attacked by three Bluegill frigates. Brahms joins the fight, destroying one frigate and pursuing the others back to Gevinon Prime. In the ensuring battle the Renegade is destroyed by Bluegill reinforcements.

Season Four: Ex Astris Mirificentia (2014-16) 
While the season continues with an overarching serial plot, Heaney intended each individual episode to have their own storylines. In Episode #401 (Every Good Captain Deserves Admiral Issues) Dovan and other members of the crew struggle to come to terms with the trauma of the preceding events. Neeva and Lorhrok battle the failing systems of their shuttle as well as Neeva's pheremones. Dovan expects a court martial on his return to Starbase 911, but Admiral Parker instead orders him on a two-year mission to explore an uncharted region of Delta Quadrant, including "unusual readings from known Iconian ruins". Parker officially promotes Dovan to permanent captain of the Excelsior, without increase in rank (Episode #401). On the first leg of their journey the Excelsior encounters a medieval planet engulfed by a plague, which an away team cannot investigate until a power source that blocks transport is neutralized. New chief engineer Kestra J'Naya arrives by shuttle and draws attention for her clumsiness and technological prowess (Episode #402).

Season Five: The Round Table (2017-21)

Season Six: The Odyssey (2021-)

Plot Timeline

Main Characters
Captain Rachel Cortez is the partly human and partly Vulcan Commanding Officer of the USS Excelsior who appears in Episodes 100 - 203. Cortez was born on February 3, 2346, on the USS Hawaii where her father, Sulan, was Chief Medical Officer and her mother, Victoria, was Chief Operations Officer. Victoria moved with the children to Starbase 117 after the death of Rachel's father. Rachel entered Starfleet Academy after the death of her mother, where she demonstrated great tactical and navigational strengths. Cortez served out the Dominion War on the USS Argentina in a tactical capacity, after which she was assigned to the USS Hector as Chief Tactical Officer. In 2379 she moved to the USS Mercury as First Officer, before becoming captain of the Excelsior. Cortez died after being heavily-wounded in ground combat on the planet Valandria on Stardate 59981.43. The role of Cortez was played by Eleiece Krawiec.
 Commander Alcar Dovan is a Bolian and the Excelsior 's First Officer during Episodes 100 - 203. Born on February 16, 2311, on the planet Gault, former home planet of Worf, he is adept at Latin which was a requirement of his secondary school education. A good pilot, Dovan's first assignment was to the  USS Endeavour (NCC-71805) on which he served as Flight Control Officer under Captain Amasov during the battle of Wolf 359. His sharp sense of humor resulted in a number of transfers after his time on the Endeavour, but his tally of medals for valor led to an assignment to the USS Defiant (NX-74205) under Commander Worf. During the Dominion War and for six years afterwards Dovan served on the USS Tokyo, during which time he helped protect a Romulan flagship. After a leave of absence on Gault, Dovan reactivated his commission in 2382 on condition that he be assigned to Taskforce 38], whose duties were to explore the Delta Quadrant via the Iconian gateway. After Captain Cortez's death, Dovan assumes command of the USS Excelsior. The role of Dovan is played by Larry Phelan.
 Chief Engineer Alecz Lorhrok is an unjoined Trill, born on his home planet in the Kalandra Sector on December 11, 2356. Due to his youthful looks he is often mistaken for an Ensign (rank) or Cadet. After hostilities during the Dominion War around his home planet ended, Lorhrok enlisted in Starfleet at the age of 18, and obtained a degree in starship design. His first posting was to the USS Steadfast (NCC-1966), where he applied his skills and an unorthodox methodology to keep the old ship in good repair. After the Steadfast was decommissioned, Lorhrok considered requesting a transfer to Utopia Planitia. Instead, he was offered and accepted the position of Chief Engineer on the Excelsior. During the first episode, while the Excelsior was still docked at Starbase 911, Lorhrok tangled with crewwoman Kinash Adow, who subsequently sabotaged Lorhrok's replicator which inadvertently affected all replicators on that whole deck. On the Excelsior 's maiden voyage to the Valendrian system Lorhrok was put in charge of young stow-away Simon Westlake. The role of Lorhrok was portrayed by Ben Randall during Episodes 100 - 102 as well as Episode #3E, and by Sam Gillis in all episodes since.

Others 
 Asuka Yubari (played by Caitlin Heaney)
 Alex Rol (played by Michael Liebmann
 Neeva (played by Kennedy)
 Dr. Melissa Sharp (played by Emily Potter)
 Joshua Underwood (played by Gareth Bowley, Episodes 301 - 401)
 Narrator (played by Mike Hennessy)

Episodes

To date Starship Excelsior has run for four seasons from December 2007. 
Episodes range in length from 33 minutes (Season One's "The Valendrian Expedition") to 2 hours and 28 minutes (Season Three's "The Graceful End"). The episodes are listed in chronological order by release date.

See also 

 Star Trek: The Continuing Mission  
 Star Trek Audio Dramas

Notes

References

External links 
 Star Trek Excelsior (Role-Playing Simulation)
 Bravo Fleet Wiki
 Starbase 911

 
Unofficial works based on Star Trek
Fan films based on Star Trek
2007 audio plays
2008 audio plays
2009 audio plays
2010 audio plays
2011 audio plays
2012 audio plays
2013 audio plays
Fiction set in the 24th century